Protogrypa is a genus of moth in the family Cosmopterigidae. It contains only one species, Protogrypa citromicta, which is found in Sri Lanka.

References

External links
Natural History Museum Lepidoptera genus database

Cosmopterigidae